Katsunari Nakahori (born September 14, 1989, in Urayasu, Chiba) known by his stage name Kaito Nakahori ( Nakahori Kaito) is a Chinese Japanese composer of contemporary music based in New York City, United States.

Biography 
Nakahori was born in Chiba. He received a Bachelor of Music degree from Toho College of Music (2012) and a Master of Music degree from San Francisco Conservatory of Music (2014). After Toru Takemitsu's music inspired him at the age of 14, he started teaching composition and piano himself. Through the influence of Takemitsu's music, Nakahori's compositional style have included Japanese traditional music elements such as Gagaku.

After graduating, he moved to New York, where he had his first portrait concert at the United Nations in 2015. He has introduced by the newspaper Chin po in Shenzhen, China, as a "Half Chinese, half Japanese, gifted composer”. 

The Japan Cultural Institute in Rome, Italy, invited him to talk about Japanese contemporary music at a symposium, when his piece Hidden instincts for piano solo was performed by Aki Takahashi in 2013. Invited by Tongyeong International Music Festival, Hotarubi for hichiriki and string quartet commissioned by Goethe Institut was premiered in 2017. By the recommendation of Toshio Hosokawa, at the 150th anniversary concert of Japan and Hungary diplomatic relations in 2019, he conducted his chamber piece Two Different Paintings commissioned by Tokyo Bunka Kaikan. Invited by Festival de Royaumont in France, Countless Wells for soprano, cello and electronics (32 speakers+IRCAM Spat) commissioned by Fondation Royaumont was premiered in 2021.

In 2020, Nakahori’s first opera Zero, text by Oriza Hirata, was premiered at Toyooka Theater Festival.

Awards 
 Impronta Ensemble Composition Competition - 1st Prize (2019)
 Brian M. Israel Prize (Society for New Music/NY Federation of Music Clubs Award) (2016)
 Senzoku Award for the Senzoku Contemporary Music Competition (2012)
 The 9th Hirosaki Sakura No Sono Composition Competition (2011)

Major works

Stage works 
 Zero (2020) opera in one act, text by Oriza Hirata

Orchestra works 
 Self Portrait (2017) for orchestra
 Leading to the Paradise (2010) for orchestra

Chamber works 
 Two Different Paintings  (2018) for chamber ensemble
 Sand Ripples (2019) for chamber ensemble
 Hotarubi (2017) for hichiriki and string quartet
 Japanese Footbridge (2014) for koto and chamber ensemble
 Setsurei (2014) for sho, cello and percussion
 Yaeyama Hirugi (2014) for clarinet and string quartet
 Summit of Mt. Fuji (2014) for chamber ensemble

Solo works 
 Meigetsu (2017) for shakuhachi
 Hidden instincts (2012) for piano

Film music 
 After Spring, the Tamaki Family... (2016) Director: Huang Yin-Yu (2016) Taipei Film Awards, Nomination.

External links 
 Official Website
 Hai-Dao Ensemble Website
 Edition Les Pois

References 

1989 births
21st-century American male musicians
21st-century classical composers
21st-century Japanese musicians
Chinese classical composers
Chinese male classical composers
Chinese opera composers
Electroacoustic music composers
Japanese classical composers
Japanese male classical composers
Japanese opera composers
Japanese people of Chinese descent
People from Urayasu, Chiba
Male opera composers
Musicians from Chiba Prefecture
Living people
Postmodern composers
San Francisco Conservatory of Music alumni